Kyar Pauk, born Han Htoo Lwin (ဟန်ထူးလွင်), is a Burmese singer-songwriter and also known as guitarist and music producer. He is best known for his punk music and founding the famous punk rock band Big Bag. He is the son of Ringo, who is a famous singer.

Biography 
Kyar Pauk was born in Taungoo, Myanmar. He founded punk rock band Big Bag in the summer of 2001. He is lead guitarist, lead vocalist & primary songwriter of Big Bag. Big Bang members include Ye Zaw Myo, Mung Boih and Phyo Min Naing.

Kyar Pauk was married to Su Le Win Zone Zone on October 29, 2006. They have two daughters, Ei Cho and sweet Cho. They divorced in 2019.

On 9 March 2018, his first solo exhibition had held named Outelligence at Yangon.

Political activities
Following the 2021 Myanmar coup d'état, Kyar Pauk was active in the anti-coup movement through social media. On 3 April 2021, warrants for his arrest were issued under section 505 (a) of the penal code by the State Administration Council for speaking out against the military coup. Along with several other celebrities, he was charged with calling for participation in the Civil Disobedience Movement (CDM) and damaging the state's ability to govern, with supporting the Committee Representing Pyidaungsu Hluttaw, and with generally inciting the people to disturb the peace and stability of the nation.

Albums with Big Bag 
Don't talk about punk
Punk for all (2001)
Famous
Villain (2005)
Bedtime music (2007)
The Big Show In The Bag
AD 3000 (2008)
Telepunk (2009)
The Sun Factory
One Eleven (2011)
We are Big Bag (2014 August)
IDGAF (2015 Sep 30)
Anger Management (2017)
A Road to Starry Night (Unplugged) [Live] (2019)

Achievements
Most Requested Song – Kyon Yin Pyaw Pay Par [City FM] 2010

Freshest Song of the Year – Thee Khan [Myanmar Music Award] 2014 

People’s Choice [Myanmar Music Award] 2014 

Best Selling Album Villain [2007] 

Best Selling Album IDGAF [2015]

Solo albums
Cinematicüs (2020 October 23)

Published books
Knott Funni
The Strange Old Man
Kyaung Sar (2019)

References

Living people
21st-century Burmese male singers
Burmese singer-songwriters
Punk rock musicians
People from Yangon
Year of birth missing (living people)
People from Bago Region